Levi J. Jones (born August 24, 1979) is a former American football offensive tackle.  He played college football at Arizona State and was drafted by the Cincinnati Bengals in the first round of the 2002 NFL Draft.

College career
Jones attended Arizona State University. Levi originally went on an academic scholarship, but decided to walk-on to the football team. He earned a bachelor's degree in exercise science with a minor in business.

Professional career

Cincinnati Bengals
Jones was drafted by the Cincinnati Bengals in the first round (10th overall) of the 2002 NFL Draft.

On July 25, 2006, Jones signed a six-year, $30 million contract extension with the Bengals.

Less than a month after the Bengals selected Alabama offensive tackle Andre Smith sixth overall in the 2009 NFL Draft, the team released Jones on May 6, 2009.

Washington Redskins
On October 20, 2009, Jones signed a free agent contract with the Washington Redskins and was the starting left tackle.

Personal

Las Vegas scuffle
In March 2007, Joey Porter and Jones were involved in a brawl at a Las Vegas casino. Porter still had unresolved issues with Jones from their days in the AFC North between Porter's Pittsburgh Steelers and Jones' Cincinnati Bengals.  On May 30, Porter pleaded not guilty to misdemeanor battery and was ordered to pay a $1,000 fine. Porter was docked 3 game paychecks for his actions. Later reports into the incident revealed that it was not just Porter, but also 6 of his friends including convicted felon Ross Earl who attacked Jones.

References

External links
 Washington Redskins bio
 Arizona State Sun Devils bio

1979 births
Living people
People from Eloy, Arizona
Sportspeople from the Phoenix metropolitan area
Players of American football from Arizona
American football offensive guards
American football offensive tackles
Arizona State Sun Devils football players
Cincinnati Bengals players
Washington Redskins players